Post-Balzac is a bronze sculpture by Judith Shea created in 1991 in an edition of three copies.

It was exhibited at the White House, and the John and Mary Pappajohn Sculpture Park.

See also
 List of public art in Washington, D.C., Ward 2

References

External links
"The Hirshhorn Sculpture Gardens", Bluffton

1991 sculptures
Hirshhorn Museum and Sculpture Garden
Sculptures of the Smithsonian Institution
Bronze sculptures in Washington, D.C.
Outdoor sculptures in Washington, D.C.